"Ride Out" is a song by American rappers Kid Ink, Tyga, Wale, YG, and Rich Homie Quan, taken from the soundtrack of the American action film Furious 7. It was released as a lead single of the soundtrack alongside the promotional single "Go Hard or Go Home," on February 17, 2015.

Music video
The song's accompanying music video premiered on February 16, 2015 on Atlantic Records account on YouTube. Since its release, the video has received over 275 million views.

Charts

Certifications

References

External links

2014 songs
2015 singles
Kid Ink songs
Tyga songs
Wale (rapper) songs
YG (rapper) songs
Rich Homie Quan songs
Songs written by Tyga
Songs written by Wale (rapper)
Songs written by Kid Ink
Songs written by PJ (singer)
Songs written by YG (rapper)

Fast & Furious music
Atlantic Records singles